Various types of sports are played in different districts of Bangladesh. The following locations (Absolute location) are sporting grounds (specially football and cricket) of different districts in Bangladesh. A minimum capacity of 5,000 is required.

See also
List of football stadiums in Bangladesh
List of cricket grounds in Bangladesh
Stadium/Venues of Bangladesh with rating

References

Sport in Bangladesh
Sports venues in Bangladesh
Cricket grounds in Bangladesh
Bangladeshi culture
Football venues in Bangladesh
Bangladesh
Stadiums